Gordon Donald "Tony" Savage (July 18, 1906 — February 28, 1974) was professional ice hockey player who played 49 games in the National Hockey League with the Boston Bruins and Montreal Canadiens during the 1934–35 season. The rest of his career, which lasted from 1926 to 1940, was spent in various minor leagues. He was born in Calgary, Alberta.

Career statistics

Regular season and playoffs

External links

1906 births
1974 deaths
Boston Bruins players
Calgary Tigers players
Canadian ice hockey defencemen
Kitchener Flying Dutchmen players
Kitchener Millionaires players
Montreal Canadiens players
Seattle Eskimos players
Ice hockey people from Calgary
Syracuse Stars (IHL) players